Valladolid Municipality (Saki' in Maya) has its seat in Valladolid, Yucatán in the southeastern part of the  Mexican state of Yucatán. 
Valladolid is in the inland eastern part of the state at 
.

Municipalities of Yucatán